Thigulla Padma Rao Goud (born 7 April 1954) is an Indian politician who is the current and 2nd Deputy Speaker of the Telangana Legislative Assembly from 24 February 2019 and Member of the Telangana Legislative Assembly from Secunderabad Constituency from 2 June 2014. He was the minister of Excise, Sports, Prohibition from 2014 to 2018 in Telangana.

Early life
Padma Rao was born on 7 April 1954 in Secunderabad. He studied till Intermediate in Govt. Junior College, SP Road, Secunderabad.

Political career
He entered politics after education and served as a Municipal Councillor in 1984 & 2001(Hyderabad Municipal Corporation). Later in 2001 he joined Telangana Rashtra Samithi. He won from  Secunderabad Assembly constituency in 2004 Assembly Election. In 2009 Assembly election he lost from Sanathnagar Assembly constituency to Congress candidate Marri Shashidhar Reddy.

In 2014 Telangana Assembly Election he was re-elected from Secunderabad Assembly constituency. He was inducted into Cabinet on June 2, 2014, and made Excise and Prohibition, Sports and Youth Services Minister of Telangana. In December 2018, he became the Deputy Speaker of the Telangana Legislative Assembly.

Personal life
He is married to Swarupa Rani and has 4 sons and 2 daughters,
namely Kishore Goud, Kiran Goud, Rameshwar Goud, Trinethra Goud, Aishwarya Goud and Mounika Goud.

References

|-

|-

Telangana Rashtra Samithi politicians
Living people
Telugu politicians
Telangana politicians
Members of the Telangana Legislative Council
State cabinet ministers of Telangana
21st-century Indian politicians
1954 births
Telangana MLAs 2018–2023